Yakov Anufrievich Rylsky (25 October 1928 in the village of Aleksandrovka, Verkhubinsky District, East Kazakhstan Region – 9 December 1999 in Moscow) was an Olympic champion and three-time world champion sabre fencer of the Soviet Union.  He competed in three Olympiads, and won two medals for the Soviet Union's fencing team.

Fencing career
Rylsky began fencing in 1949.  He was a member of the USSR National Team between 1953 and 1966.

Rylsky was the Soviet sabre champion from 1954–58.  In 1963, he was the winner of the Dantzer Cup in Paris.  He was a Merited Master of Sport in the Soviet Union, the highest honor give to Soviet athletes.

Rylsky trained at Dynamo in Moscow.

World championships
Rylsky was a 3-time gold medalist in individual sabre at the World Fencing Championships (the 1958 World Fencing Championships, 1961 World Fencing Championships, and 1963 World Fencing Championships).

Olympics
Rylsky competed in the individual and team sabre events in Fencing at the 1956 Summer Olympics in Melbourne.  In the team competition, Rylsky and his teammates lost to Poland (9–7) and Hungary (9–7) in the final pool, but won the bronze medal by beating France in the third-place match. Rylsky was eliminated in the second round of the individual competition.

Rylsky participated in individual and team events in Fencing at the 1960 Summer Olympics in Rome. They finished fifth in the team event, and Rylsky reached the finals in the individual competition and finished eighth.

In Rylsky's final Olympiad appearance, in Fencing at the 1964 Summer Olympics in Tokyo, he won a gold medal in the team sabre event.  He finished fourth in the individual event.

See also
List of select Jewish fencers

References

Sources
Jews in Sports bio

1928 births
1999 deaths
Soviet male fencers
Kazakhstani male sabre fencers
Russian male sabre fencers
Russian Jews
Jewish Kazakhstani sportspeople
Olympic fencers of the Soviet Union
Fencers at the 1956 Summer Olympics
Fencers at the 1960 Summer Olympics
Fencers at the 1964 Summer Olympics
Olympic gold medalists for the Soviet Union
Olympic bronze medalists for the Soviet Union
Olympic medalists in fencing
Dynamo sports society athletes
Medalists at the 1956 Summer Olympics
Medalists at the 1964 Summer Olympics
Jewish male sabre fencers
People from East Kazakhstan Region